Moon Studios GmbH is an Austrian independent video game developer founded in 2010. They are best known for their 2015 title Ori and the Blind Forest, for which the studio was awarded the Best Debut award at the 2016 Game Developers Choice Awards. The studio then released a sequel, Ori and the Will of the Wisps, in 2020.

History
The studio was founded in 2010 by Thomas Mahler and Gennadiy Korol. During Mahler's tenure at Blizzard Entertainment, the successes of independent games like Castle Crashers, Limbo, and Braid encouraged him to leave the company to found an independent studio. The two chose the name "Moon Studios" as the company name as they were inspired by John F. Kennedy's quote "We choose to go to the Moon". Mahler described Moon Studios as a "virtual studio", as the team did not rent an office and instead recruited talents from all over the world. Team members came from places such as Austria, Australia, Israel and the United States, and they collaborated with each other using the Internet. The company's headquarters are located in Mahler's native Vienna.

After assembling the team, Moon Studios started creating prototypes. One early prototype was named Warsoup, which is a first-person shooter mixed with real-time strategy elements. Another prototype was named Sein, which mixed Metroidvania and platformer gameplay together. Moon Studios started pitching Warsoup to publishers. Microsoft dismissed Warsoup but agreed to fund Sein, with Microsoft retaining the rights to the intellectual property. With a core team of 10 people alongside several remote working contractors, the game, which would later be renamed to Ori and the Blind Forest, took the team 4 years to develop. The team met with each other for the first time at E3 2014, when the announcement trailer was released. Ori and the Blind Forest received critical acclaim when it was released in March 2015. It was also a commercial success, as it recouped its development in 7 days.

Following the success of Ori and the Blind Forest, the team expanded significantly. As of March 2020, the studio employed more than 80 people, and recruited talents from 43 countries. To facilitate communication, Moon built its own communication tool named "Apollo". The team also organised yearly retreats to ensure that the team can bond together. At E3 2017 they announced a  sequel, Ori and the Will of the Wisps, which was released for the Xbox One and Windows 10 on March 10, 2020.

The company is now working on an action role-playing game, which is set to be published by Private Division.

Games developed

Allegations of workplace abuse 
In March 2022 VentureBeat published an article that detailed allegations of workplace abuse at Moon Studios with a particular focus on Mahler and Korol. These included claims of regular arguments during development, claims of a oppressive crunch culture at the studio and claims of racist, sexist, and anti-semitic language being used by Mahler and Korol during work hours.

In a response to the report, Mahler and Korol claimed the details of the report were not representative of the working environment of the studio, nor its employees, touted the studio's multiculturalism, but also acknowledge that they have teased their cultural backgrounds. In addition, they expressed regret if anyone on staff felt uncomfortable or let down by their actions.

References

External links 
 

Video game development companies
Video game companies established in 2010
Video game companies of Austria
Companies based in Vienna
Austrian companies established in 2010
Privately held companies of Austria